Sakač is a Croatian surname. Notable people with the surname include:

  (1918–1979), Croatian composer
 Stjepan Krizin Sakač (1890–1973), Croatian historian

Croatian surnames